The FIFA U-17 World Championship 1995, the sixth edition of the tournament, was held in the cities of Guayaquil, Portoviejo, Quito, Ibarra, Cuenca, and Riobamba in Ecuador between 3 and 20 August 1995. Players born after 1 August 1978 could participate in this tournament. Ecuador was originally to have hosted the 1991 FIFA U-17 World Championship but due to an outbreak of cholera, that tournament was moved to Italy.

Venues

Qualified Teams

Squads
For a list of all squads that played in the final tournament, see 1995 FIFA U-17 World Championship squads

Referees

Asia
  Hossein Asgari
  Ahmad Haji Yaakub
Africa
  Pierre Mounguengui
  Said Belqola
  Fethi Barkallah
CONCACAF
  Antonio Marrufo
  Ramesh Ramdhan

South America
  Roger Zambrano
  Epifanio González
  José Luis da Rosa
Europe
  Fritz Stuchlik
  Hartmut Strampe
  Leslie Irvine
  Vasyl Melnychuk
Oceania
  Barry Tasker

Group stage

Group A

Group B

Group C

Group D

Knockout Phase

Quarterfinals

Semifinals

Playoff for 3rd place

Final

Result

Goalscorers

Daniel Allsopp of Australia won the Golden Shoe award for scoring five goals. In total, 84 goals were scored by 57 different players, with only one of them credited as own goal.

5 goals
  Daniel Allsopp
  Mohammed Amar Al-Kathiri
4 goals
  Fernando Gatti
3 goals
  Abu Iddrisu
2 goals

  César La Paglia
  Pablo Aimar
  Juan
  Marco Antônio
  Rodrigo
  Baba Sule
  Dini Kamara
  Emmanuel Bentil
  Edward Anyamkygh
  James Obiorah
  Taqi Al-Siyabi
  Vargas
  Zeferino
  Jesús Duarte

1 goal

  Esteban Cambiasso
  Luis Caserio
  Sixto Peralta
  Harry Kewell
  Bel
  Carlos Alberto
  Djimi
  Eduardo
  Fabio
  Kléber
  Rocha
  Patrice Bernier
  Andrey Campos
  Nelson Fonseca
  Diego Ayala
  Exon Corozo
  Felix Angulo
  Luis Moreira
  Alexander Bugera
  Damian Brezina
  Timo Rost
  Attakora Amaniampong
  Bashiru Gambo
  Charles Akwei
  Joseph Ansah
  Ibrahima Conte
  Ousmane Bangoura
  Souleymane Keita
  Kotaro Yamazaki
  Naohiro Takahara
  Chiedu Chukwueke
  Henry Onwuzuruike
  Hani Al-Dhabit
  Adolfo
  Jaweed Ghulam
  Jordi Ferrón
  Mista
  Jorge Redmond

Own goal
  Víctor Mercado (playing against Argentina)

Final ranking

External links
 FIFA U-17 World Championship Ecuador 1995, FIFA.com
 FIFA Technical Report (Part 1), (Part 2) and (Part 3)

FIFA U-17 World Championship
International association football competitions hosted by Ecuador
FIFA
FIFA U-17 World Cup tournaments
August 1995 sports events in South America